KNEE-LD, VHF digital channel 10, was a low-powered independent television station licensed to Malaga, Washington, United States. The station was owned by the Apple Valley TV Association.

History
The station was originally K10CM, a translator station for ABC affiliate KXLY-TV (channel 4) in Spokane. On December 13, 2004, the station changed its call letters from K10CM to KNEE-LP. On July 1, 2006, KNEE-LP became a separate station from KXLY-TV when the station started  broadcasting the "Wenatchee Valley Community Real-estate TV Channel", specialising in real estate listings for homes and property in the Wenatchee Valley. Their news slogan was "When and Where you need it, KNEE is on top, KNEE is there." On March 8, 2011, KNEE-LP changed the KNEE-LP call letters again to KNEE-LD to reflect that the station was broadcasting as a digital only station instead of as an analog station.

KNEE-LD's license was cancelled by the Federal Communications Commission on February 9, 2023, for failure to file an application for license renewal.

Translators
KNEE-LD was rebroadcast on two low-powered translators.
K42IH-D is owned and operated by the Apple Valley TV Association and KNEE-LD.

K10BA-D Channel 10 Orondo
K42IH-D Channel 42 East Wenatchee

Cable coverage and live streaming audio
KNEE-LD 10 was seen on the following cable companies in the Wenatchee area. KNEE-LD 10 audio was streaming live on its website however, there was no live video streaming.

Entiat Cable TV Channel 27
Malaga Cable TV Channel 47
Charter Cable is coming soon TBA
Streaming Audio at www.realestateontv.com

References

External links
Wenatchee Valley Community Real-estate TV Channel (website for sale)

Television stations in Washington (state)
Television channels and stations established in 2004
Low-power television stations in the United States
Defunct television stations in the United States
Television channels and stations disestablished in 2023
2023 disestablishments in Washington (state)